The Mongolian Revolution of 1990, known in Mongolia as the 1990 Democratic Revolution, was a peaceful democratic revolution which led to the country's transition to a multi-party system. It was inspired by the economic reforms of the Soviet Union in the late 1980s and was one of the many revolutions of 1989. It was led mostly by young demonstrators who rallied at Sükhbaatar Square, in the capital Ulaanbaatar. The main organisers of the demonstrations included Sanjaasürengiin Zorig, Erdeniin Bat-Üül, Davaadorjiin Ganbold, Tsakhiagiin Elbegdorj, Bat-Erdeniin Batbayar, and Dogmidiin Sosorbaram. 

Although one-party rule in Mongolia officially ended with the adoption of a new constitution on 12 February 1992, the Mongolian People's Revolutionary Party (MPRP) remained in power until it was defeated by the Democratic Union Coalition in the 1996 legislative election. However, the MPRP government of the early multi-party period had already begun transitioning the country to a market economy by 1993.

Background
There were pro-independence movements in 1911 against the colonisation policy of the late Qing dynasty. Finally, the Mongolian People's Party took power in Mongolia in 1921 with the help of the Soviet Union, after White Russian and Chinese forces had been expelled. In 1924, the party renamed itself the Mongolian People's Revolutionary Party.
Over the following decades, Mongolia was always very closely aligned with the Soviet Union. After the resignation of Yumjaagiin Tsedenbal in 1984, and inspired by Mikhail Gorbachev's reforms in the Soviet Union, the new leadership under Jambyn Batmönkh implemented economic reforms but failed to appeal to those who, in late 1989, wanted broader changes.

Course of events
Young people in Mongolia wanted a change in society, the way the government was conducting its business. They began to meet and discuss secretly. For example, during his studies in the USSR, Tsakhiagiin Elbegdorj learned about Glasnost, the concepts such as freedom of speech and economic liberties. After returning to Mongolia, he met other like-minded people and tried to present those ideas to a wider audience, despite attempts of repression from the Politburo-authority of the government. On 28 November 1989, at the end of a speech at the Young Artists' Second National Congress, Tsakhiagiin Elbegdorj said that Mongolia needed democracy and appealed for youth to collaborate to create democracy in Mongolia. He told the audience "We consider that Perestroika is a timely and brave step. Youth's contribution to this revolutionary matter is not by supportive talks but by certain work. Our contribution is our objectives to be fulfilled. Our objectives are:... following democracy and transparency and contributing to glasnost,... and supporting fair progressive power... These are the objectives of an initiatives' group-an organization that shall work. After the congress I hope we will gather and discuss with you about it in this (newly forming group). The organization shall be based on public, voluntary and democratic principles."

The chairman of the congress stopped Elbegdorj's speech and warned him not to say such things. It was 1989 and Mongolia had been a communist country for 68 years. At that time, it was alleged that every other person was an unofficial communist party spy who would report people who expressed opinions other than socialism and communism. During the break of the congress, two young individuals Dari. Sukhbaatar and Chimediin Enkhee met Elbegdorj and the three agreed to found a democratic movement and to secretly spread the news to other young people. Later the three met and united with ten other individuals and they are known as the Thirteen Leaders of Mongolia's Democratic Revolution. On his return from the congress, his boss at the newspaper Ulaan Od warned Elbegdorj that he would be fired if he participated further in any activities out of work or engaged in any conduct inconsistent with communist and socialist ideology. Despite the warning, Elbegdorj and his friends met secretly with other young people in the circle auditorium of the National University of Mongolia and discussed democracy, free-market economic policy, and other prohibited subjects of the time, and began to draft a plan to organise a democratic movement. They met many times and brought new friends and new supporters to join them secretly. One night they placed ads of their open demonstration in the streets.

On the morning of 10 December 1989, the first open pro-democracy public demonstration occurred in front of the Youth Cultural Center in Ulaanbaatar. There, Elbegdorj announced the creation of the Mongolian Democratic Union. And thus, the first pro-democracy movement in Mongolia was born.

The protesters called for Mongolia to adopt perestroika and glasnost. Dissident leaders demanded free elections and economic reform, but within the context of a "human democratic socialism". The protesters injected a nationalist element into the protests by using traditional Mongolian script—which most Mongolians could not read—as a symbolic repudiation of the political system which had imposed the Mongolian Cyrillic alphabet. In late December, demonstrations increased when news came of Garry Kasparov's interview to Playboy, suggesting that the Soviet Union could improve its economic health by selling Mongolia to China. On 2 January 1990, Mongolian Democratic Union began distributing leaflets calling for a democratic revolution. When the government did not comply with this and later, more aggressive demands, demonstrations occurred.

On 14 January 1990, the protesters, having grown from three hundred to some 1,000, met on square in front of Lenin Museum which was named as Freedom Square since then in Ulaanbaatar. A demonstration on Sükhbaatar Square on 21 January (in weather of −30 C) followed. Protesters carried banners alluding to Chinggis Khaan, rehabilitating a figure which Soviet schooling neglected to praise. They celebrated Daramyn Tömör-Ochir, a politician who was purged from the MPRP in 1962 as part of the MPRP's efforts to suppress the commemoration of the 800th anniversary of Genghis Khan's birth. And the rebels carried a modified Flag of Mongolia which lacked a star symbolising socialism; this flag would become the new flag after the revolution.

In subsequent months activists continued to organise demonstrations, rallies, protests and hunger strikes, as well as teachers' and workers' strikes. Activists had growing support from Mongolians, both in the capital and the countryside and the union's activities led to other calls for democracy all over the country. After came weekend demonstrations in January and February and the forming of Mongolia's first opposition parties. The demonstrations expanded to many thousands of people in the capital city, in Erdenet and Darkhan, and to the provincial centers, notably Mörön in Khövsgöl.

After numerous demonstrations of many thousands of people in the capital city as well as provincial centers, on 4 March 1990, the MDU and three other reform organisations held a joint outdoor mass meeting, inviting the government to attend. The government sent no representative to what became a demonstration of over 100,000 people demanding democratic change. On 7 March 1990, on Sükhbaatar Square, Democratic Union launched a hunger strike of ten urging that the communists to resign. Hunger strikers number increased and thousands supported them. Mongolian People's Revolutionary Party(MPRP) (present Mongolian People's Party)'s Politburo – the authority of the government eventually gave way to the pressure and entered into negotiations with the leaders of the democratic movement Mongolian Democratic Union. Jambyn Batmönkh, chairman of Politburo of MPRP's Central Committee decided to dissolve the Politburo and to resign on 9 March 1990. 
Behind the scenes, however, the MPRP had seriously considered cracking down on the protesters, writing a decree that was left to be signed by the party leader Jambyn Batmönkh. Batmönkh opposed it, maintaining a strict policy of never using force. Those that were present there later recalled that Batmönkh said "I will never sign this. We few Mongols have not yet come to the point that we will make each other's noses bleed," smacked the table, and left the room."

Elbegdorj announced the news of Politburo resignation to the hunger strikers and to people who had gathered on Sükhbaatar Square at 10:00 pm on that day after the negotiations between leaders of MPRP and Mongolian Democratic Union. The hunger strike stopped. The MPRP Politburo resignation paved the way for the first multi-party elections in Mongolia. The new government announced Mongolia's first free parliamentary elections, which were to be held in July.

The roles of women in the protest were low-key, such as providing food and drinks to the demonstrators; all the visible protest leaders were men, mirroring the traditional subordinate role of women in Mongolia.

Aftermath
 
Following the 1990 Democratic Revolution in Mongolia, Mongolia's first free, multi-party elections for a bicameral parliament were held on 29 July 1990. In 1990 Mongolian parliamentary elections, parties ran for 430 seats in the People's Great Khural. Opposition parties were not able to nominate enough candidates. The opposition nominated 346 candidates for the 430 seats in the Great Khural (upper house). The Mongolian People's Revolutionary Party (MPRP) won 357 seats in the Great Khural and 31 out of 53 seats in the Small Khural (which was later abolished) as well. The MPRP enjoyed a strong position in the countryside.

Nonetheless, the new MPRP government under Dashiin Byambasüren shared power with the democrats, and implemented constitutional and economic reforms. As these reforms coincided with the dissolution of the Soviet Union, which had until 1990 provided significant economic aid to Mongolia's state budget, the country did experience harsh economic problems: enterprises closed down, inflation rose, and basic food had to be rationed for a time. Foreign trade broke down, economic and technical aid from the former socialist countries ended, and domestic economy was struggling with privatisation. A thriving black market arose in Ulaanbaatar by 1988 to accommodate the needs of the populace.

The People's Great Khural (upper house) first met on 3 September and elected a president (MPRP), vice president (Social Democrat), prime minister (MPRP), and 50 members to the Baga Hural (lower house). The vice president was also chairman of the Baga Khural. In November 1991, the People's Great Khural (Parliament) began discussion on a new constitution, which entered into force on 12 February 1992. In addition to establishing Mongolia as an independent, sovereign republic and guaranteeing a number of rights and freedoms, the new constitution restructured the legislative branch of government, creating a unicameral legislature, the State Great Khural (SGK).

The constitution was amended in 1992. The first election win for the democrats was the presidential election of 1993, when the opposition candidate Punsalmaagiin Ochirbat won.

A Democratic Union Coalition co-led by Democratic Party chairman Tsakhiagiin Elbegdorj for the first time succeeded in winning the majority in the 1996 parliamentary elections.
The Democratic Party has been part of three coalition governments with the former ruling MPRP in 2004–2008 and in 2008–2012 respectively; and with the Civil Will-Green Party and new MPRP from 2012 and on.

In the 2009 Mongolian Presidential election, the Democratic Party candidate, Tsakhiagiin Elbegdorj — one of the democratic revolution leaders — defeated the MPRP candidate, incumbent President Nambaryn Enkhbayar. Following this victory, in the 2012 Parliamentary elections, the Democratic Party won again. In the 2012 local elections of the capital city, provinces and districts, the Democratic Party won for the first time in the country's history. In the 2013 Mongolian Presidential election, the Democratic Party candidate, incumbent President Tsakhiagiin Elbegdorj, won. Thus, the Democratic Party that stemmed from the Democratic Union — that is, the pro-democracy activists — has been in control of Mongolia's presidency, parliament and government between 2013 and 2016, when it was defeated at the Parliamentary Elections.

See also
 Mongolian Revolution of 1911
 Mongolian Revolution of 1921
 2018–2019 Mongolian protests

References 

History of Mongolia
20th century in Mongolia
Mongolia
1989 in Mongolia
1990 in Mongolia
Decommunization
Nonviolent revolutions
Protests in Mongolia
Mongolia
Conflicts in 1990